Songs of the Third and Fifth is the fifth full-length studio album by the Australian alternative metal band The Mark of Cain. It was released in November 2012 by Feel Presents and produced by singer John Scott and Tim Pittman. Former producer, Henry Rollins contributed vocals to the track "Grey 11". Recorded by Evan James at Broadcast Studio in Adelaide, the album was mixed by Forrester Savell (Karnivool, Dead Letter Circus) and mastered in New York by Tom Coyne (DJ Shadow, The Roots). The Sydney Morning Herald called the album "an outstanding return".

Track listing
 Barkhammer (3:30)
 Avenger (4:21)
 Separatist (4:40)
 Milosevic (4:37)
 Eastern Decline (4:51)
 Grey 11 (feat. Henry Rollins) (4:44)
 1000 Yards (6:17)
 The Argument (5:20)
 Heart of Stone (3:44)

Personnel
John Scott - guitar, vocals, keyboards
Kim Scott - bass
John Stanier - drums, cymbals, percussion

Charts

References

2012 albums
The Mark of Cain (band) albums